Colleen LaBaff (born c.1962) is an American make-up artist. She was nominated for an Academy Award in the category Best Makeup and Hairstyling for the film Mank. She is from Port Charlotte, Florida.

Selected filmography 
 Mank (2020; co-nominated with Gigi Williams and Kimberley Spiteri)

References

External links 

Living people
Year of birth missing (living people)
Place of birth missing (living people)
American make-up artists
20th-century American women
21st-century American women